First Live 1993 is a live album by John Zorn's Masada documenting their premier live appearance at the Knitting Factory in September, 1993.

Reception
The Allmusic review by Thom Jurek awarded the album 3 stars, stating, "For the fanatics who have everything Masada, this is no exception in its necessity. For the curious and cautious, this is a wonderfully accessible place to begin an odyssey".

Track listing 
All compositions by John Zorn
 "Piram" – 5:55
 "Sansanah" – 7:10
 "Ziphim" – 7:16
 "Zebdi" – 5:00
 "Hadasha" – 7:38
 "Rachab/Lebaoth" – 7:04 
 "Hazor" – 7:02
Recorded live at the Knitting Factory on September 12, 1993

Personnel 
Masada
 John Zorn – saxophone
 Dave Douglas – trumpet
 Greg Cohen – bass
 Joey Baron – drums

References 

Albums produced by John Zorn
Masada (band) albums
John Zorn live albums
2002 live albums
Tzadik Records live albums